Christian art is sacred art which uses subjects, themes, and imagery from Christianity. Most Christian groups use or have used art to some extent, including early Christian art and architecture and Christian media.

Images of Jesus and narrative scenes from the Life of Christ are the most common subjects, and scenes from the Old Testament play a part in the art of most denominations. Images of the Virgin Mary and saints are much rarer in Protestant art than that of Roman Catholicism and Eastern Orthodoxy.

Christianity makes far wider use of images than related religions, in which figurative representations are forbidden, such as Islam and Judaism. However, there are some that have promoted aniconism in Christianity, and there have been periods of iconoclasm within Christianity, though this is not a common interpretation of Christian theology.

History

Beginnings

Early Christian art survives from dates near the origins of Christianity, although many early Christians associated figurative art with pagan religion, and were suspicious or hostile towards it. Hans Belting wrote that "in late antiquity... Christianity adopted the cult images of the "pagans", in a complete reversal of its original attitude, and developed an image practice of its own."  But large free-standing sculpture, the medium for the most prominent pagan images, continued to be distrusted and largely shunned for some centuries, and virtually up to the present day in the Orthodox world.  The oldest Christian sculptures are small reliefs from Roman sarcophagi, dating to the beginning of the 2nd century.  The largest groups of Early Christian paintings come from the tombs in the Catacombs of Rome, and show the evolution of the depiction of Jesus, a process not complete until the 6th century, since when the conventional appearance of Jesus in art has remained remarkably consistent.

Until the adoption of Christianity by Constantine Christian art derived its style and much of its iconography from popular Roman art, but from this point grand Christian buildings built under imperial patronage brought a need for Christian versions of Roman elite and official art, of which mosaics in churches in Rome are the most prominent surviving examples.  Christian art was caught up in, but did not originate, the shift in style from the classical tradition inherited from Ancient Greek art to a less realist and otherworldly hieratic style, the start of gothic art.

Middle Ages

Much of the art surviving from Europe after the fall of the Western Roman Empire is Christian art, although this in large part because the continuity of church ownership has preserved church art better than secular works.  While the Western Roman Empire's political structure essentially collapsed after the fall of Rome, its religious hierarchy, what is today the modern-day Roman Catholic Church commissioned and funded production of religious art imagery.

The Orthodox Church of Constantinople, which enjoyed greater stability within the surviving Eastern Empire was key in commissioning imagery there and glorifying Christianity. As a stable Western European society emerged during the Middle Ages, the Catholic Church led the way in terms of art, using its resources to commission paintings and sculptures.

During the development of Christian art in the Byzantine Empire (see Byzantine art), a more abstract aesthetic replaced the naturalism previously established in Hellenistic art. This new style was hieratic, meaning its primary purpose was to convey religious meaning rather than accurately render objects and people.  Realistic perspective, proportions, light and colour were ignored in favour of geometric simplification of forms, reverse perspective and standardized conventions to portray individuals and events.  The controversy over the use of graven images, the interpretation of the Second Commandment, and the crisis of Byzantine Iconoclasm led to a standardization of religious imagery within the Eastern Orthodoxy.

Renaissance and early modern period

The fall of Constantinople in 1453 brought an end to the highest quality Byzantine art, produced in the Imperial workshops there. Orthodox art, known as icons regardless of the medium, has otherwise continued with relatively little change in subject and style up to the present day, with Russia gradually becoming the leading centre of production.

In the West, the Renaissance saw an increase in monumental secular works, although Christian art continued to be commissioned in great quantities by churches, clergy and by the aristocracy.  The Reformation had a huge impact on Christian art; Martin Luther in Germany allowed and encouraged the display of a more limited range of religious imagery in churches, seeing the Evangelical Lutheran Church as a continuation of the "ancient, apostolic church". Lutheran altarpieces like the 1565 Last Supper by the younger Cranach were produced in Germany, especially by Luther's friend Lucas Cranach, to replace Catholic ones, often containing portraits of leading reformers as the apostles or other protagonists, but retaining the traditional depiction of Jesus. As such, "Lutheran worship became a complex ritual choreography set in a richly furnished church interior." Lutherans proudly employed the use of the crucifix as it highlighted their high view of the Theology of the Cross. Thus, for Lutherans, "the Reformation renewed rather than removed the religious image." On the other hand, Christians from a Reformed background were generally iconoclastic, destroying existing religious imagery and usually only creating more in the form of book illustrations.

Artists were commissioned to produce more secular genres like portraits, landscape paintings and because of the revival of Neoplatonism, subjects from classical mythology.  In Catholic countries, production of religious art continued, and increased during the Counter-Reformation, but Catholic art was brought under much tighter control by the church hierarchy than had been the case before.  From the 18th century the number of religious works produced by leading artists declined sharply, though important commissions were still placed, and some artists continued to produce large bodies of religious art on their own initiative.

Modern period
As a secular, non-sectarian, universal notion of art arose in 19th-century Western Europe, ancient and Medieval Christian art began to be collected for art appreciation rather than worship, while contemporary Christian art was considered marginal.  Occasionally, secular artists treated Christian themes (Bouguereau, Manet) — but only rarely was a Christian artist included in the historical canon (such as Rouault or Stanley Spencer).  However many modern artists such as Eric Gill, Marc Chagall, Henri Matisse, Jacob Epstein, Elisabeth Frink and Graham Sutherland have produced well-known works of art for churches. Salvador Dalí is an artist who had also produced notable and popular artworks with Christian themes. Contemporary artists such as Makoto Fujimura have had significant influence both in sacred and secular arts. Other notable artists include Larry D. Alexander and John August Swanson. Some writers, such as Gregory Wolfe, see this as part of a rebirth of Christian humanism.

Popular devotional art
Since the advent of printing, the sale of reproductions of pious works has been a major element of popular Christian culture. In the 19th century, this included genre painters such as Mihály Munkácsy. The invention of color lithography led to broad circulation of holy cards. In the modern era, companies specializing in modern commercial Christian artists such as Thomas Blackshear and Thomas Kinkade, although widely regarded in the fine art world as kitsch, have been very successful.

Subjects

Subjects often seen in Christian art include the following.  See Life of Christ and Life of the Virgin for fuller lists of narrative scenes included in cycles:

Motifs
The Virgin Mary is shown spinning and weaving, appearing in artworks with a loom or knitting needles, weaving cloth over her womb, or knitting for her son. The imagery, much of it German, places the sacred narratives in the domestic realm. She is shown weaving in paintings of The Annunciation, or spinning. Although spinning was less common an example is found in some convents where nuns would spin silk, presumably to create a link between the convent community of women and the image of the Mary.

See also

Notes

References
 
 Régamey, Pie-Raymond (1952). Art sacré au XXe siècle? Éditions du Cerf.
 Jean Soldini, Storia, memoria, arte sacra tra passato e futuro, in Sacre Arti, by Flaminio Gualdoni (editor), Tristan Tzara, S. Yanagi, Titus Burckhardt, Bologna, FMR, 2008, pp. 166–233.

Further reading

External links
 Princeton's Index of Medieval Art

 
Religious art